Alvise Molino (died 1604) was a Roman Catholic prelate who served as Archbishop (Personal Title) of Treviso (1595–1604) and Archbishop of Zadar (1592–1595).

Biography
Alvise Molino was born in Venice, Italy. On 6 Nov 1592, he was appointed during the papacy of Pope Clement VIII as Archbishop of Zadar.
On 13 November 1595, he was appointed during the papacy of Pope Clement VIII as Archbishop (Personal Title) of Treviso.
He served as Bishop of Treviso until his death in 1604.

References

External links and additional sources
 (for Chronology of Bishops) 
 (for Chronology of Bishops) 
 (for Chronology of Bishops) 
 (for Chronology of Bishops) 

16th-century Roman Catholic archbishops in the Republic of Venice
17th-century Roman Catholic archbishops in the Republic of Venice
Bishops appointed by Pope Clement VIII
1604 deaths